Skyscraper is a 1928 American silent drama film directed by Howard Higgin. At the 2nd Academy Awards in 1930, Elliott J. Clawson was nominated for an Academy Award in the category Best Writing (Adapted Screenplay). Prints of the film exist.

Cast
 William Boyd as Blondy
 Alan Hale as Slim Strede
 Sue Carol as Sally
 Alberta Vaughn as Jane
 Wesley Barry as Redhead
 Paul Weigel as Redhead's father

Development
In 1927, Cecil B. DeMille charged Ayn Rand - at the time, recently arrived from the Soviet Union - with writing a script for what would become Skyscraper. The original story, by Dudley Murphy, was about two construction workers involved in building a New York skyscraper who are rivals for a woman's love. Rand rewrote the story, transforming the rivals into architects. One of them, Howard Kane, was an idealist dedicated to his mission and erecting the skyscraper despite enormous obstacles. The film would have ended with Kane's throwing back his head in victory, standing atop the completed skyscraper. DeMille rejected Rand's script, and the completed film followed Murphy's original idea, but Rand's version contained elements she would later use in The Fountainhead.

References

External links
 
 

1928 films
1928 drama films
Silent American drama films
American silent feature films
American black-and-white films
Films directed by Howard Higgin
Pathé Exchange films
1920s American films